Matthew Sean Campbell (born October 29, 1970 in Ames, Iowa) was the 2010 Democratic nominee for the United States Congress in Iowa's 5th congressional district, challenging incumbent Republican Representative Steve King.

Early life and education
Campbell is the oldest of five and son of Harry and Dianne Campbell. He is a fifth generation Campbell to have lived on the Iowa Century Farm near Manning, Iowa, established in 1880. Campbell attended Manning High School where he was a captain on the football and basketball teams his senior year and was a third-team all-state linebacker. Campbell graduated from Manning High School in 1989 and was awarded a four-year full college tuition scholarship by Morningside College where he earned a B.A. in political science and economics in 1993. Campbell studied US-Japanese bilateral relationship in Osaka, Japan as part of his Morningside College education through an exchange program with Kansai Gaidai University from 1992 until 1993. He later achieved a law degree from the University of Iowa College of Law, and an LL.M in taxation from Georgetown University which is perennially-ranked as one of the best tax law programs in the nation. Campbell, through the Iowa Sister States program, further was a guest of the Taiwanese Ministry of Education for the 1995 International Seminar on Chinese Studies in Taipei.

Campbell is a founding member of the Iowa chapter of the Hugh O'Brian Youth Leadership Foundation Alumni Association having served as its president for its first two years of existence and was the director of the 1992 Sioux City Community Leadership and Educational Workshop for high school youth at Morningside College. Campbell was a 1988 Iowa youth delegate to the Rural Electric Cooperative Association Youth Tour in Washington D.C. courtesy of the Iowa Association of Rural Electric Cooperatives and is a member of the United Methodist Church.

As a student Matt Campbell volunteered and interned for U.S. Senator Tom Harkin in his Sioux City office. He campaigned for Harkin in Iowa and New Hampshire during his 1992 run for U.S. President. In 2003, Campbell was a juror in State of Iowa vs Rodney Heemstra, a first degree murder case filed in Warren County but moved to Sioux City due to extensive pretrial publicity. Heemstra, a farmer in Warren County, was accused of shooting and killing fellow farmer Tom Lyon in January 2003 over a land dispute. Heemstra pled not guilty and invoked a self-defense claim. The jury, however, rejected Heemstra's claims and found Heemstra guilty after two days of deliberations. Campbell and two other jurors later were later interviewed about the case for a Dateline NBC special.

Professional career
Campbell served as an intern at the U.S. Court of Federal Claims for Moody R. Tidwell, Justice Paul J. Kilburg of the U.S. Bankruptcy Court and as a research assistant at the University of Iowa, College of Law for Andrew G.T. Moore II, formerly of the Delaware Supreme Court. He worked for KPMG including a rotation at its Washington National Tax Practice and worked exclusively in federal income tax issues at Kalbian Hagerty, LLP, the outside general counsel for the United Arab Emirates embassy in Washington D.C.

Campbell has over 10 years experience providing international tax services, during which time he represented numerous Fortune 500 companies on a wide range of tax issues, primarily in mergers and acquisitions. Campbell most recently served as the South region lead for international tax, working primarily with nonpublic companies averaging between $20 million and $300 million in annual revenue, for BKD, LLP in Houston, Texas, the nation's 10th largest accounting and auditing firm in the nation. He has participated in Praxity global tax conferences and works with companies expanding into markets abroad or which have ongoing worldwide operations.

2010 U.S. Congressional campaign

Campbell was the Democratic nominee challenging Republican incumbent Steve King for the 5th District seat. He received the maximum individual contribution amount possible from business billionaire Warren Buffett.

Campbell won the 2010 Democratic primary winning with 76% of the Democratic vote but was defeated on November 2, 2010, with incumbent Steve King garnering 66% of the vote with 128,363 votes to Campbell's 63,160 votes.

Political positions
In April, 2010, Campbell stated his issue positions in an interview with the Spencer Daily Reporter.

Businesses and jobs
Campbell hopes to bring more businesses and jobs to Iowa by pursuing Iowa's fair share of stimulus dollars, used for the construction of high-technology manufacturing plants. He wants to create a liaison for renewable energy projects to help investors identify which projects are most logical, mandate interchange agreements for local energy producers and guarantee financing to get projects started. He wants to create an economic development liaison to provide better assistance for small businesses. From his experience in working with nonpublic companies averaging between $20 million and $300 million in annual revenue, he sees the need to get more of those types of industries established in Iowa.

Financial regulation reform
Campbell supports increased oversight of the financial sector.

Health care reform
Campbell supports the health care reform bill and that the majority of Americans will support it once they understand it. He believes it will save money, but will make changes if it raises taxes or increases premiums.

Afghanistan and Iraq
He supported the decision for military action in both Afghanistan and Iraq, but also believes involvement in both countries should begin "winding down."

Immigration
Campbell considers himself a law and order Democrat and opposes any kind of amnesty for illegal immigrants currently in the U.S.

References

External links 
 Matt Campbell for Congress - official campaign site
 
 Campaign contributions at OpenSecrets.org
 Matt Campbell column archives at The Huffington Post
 From the farm to the campaign trail: Campbell hoping to unseat Rep. Steve King in November , Gabe Licht, Spencer Daily Reporter, April 20, 2010

Living people
1970 births
People from Carroll County, Iowa
Iowa Democrats
Morningside University alumni
University of Iowa College of Law alumni
Georgetown University Law Center alumni
Iowa lawyers